The fourth HMS Comus was a  light cruiser of the Royal Navy that saw service in World War I.  She was part of the Caroline group of the C class.

Construction
Built by Swan Hunter at Wallsend, Comus was laid down on 13 November 1913 and launched on 16 December 1914.

Service history

World War I
Commissioned into service in the Royal Navy on 15 May 1915, Comus was assigned to the 4th Light Cruiser Squadron in the Grand Fleet. She and the destroyer  sank the Imperial German Navy merchant raider  in the North Sea on 29 February 1916, and she fought in the Battle of Jutland on 31 May-1 June 1916 under the command of Captain Alan Geoffrey Hotham. During the battle, at about 8:40 p.m. 31 May Comus sent information to the Grand Fleet Commander, Admiral John Jellicoe, about the location of the German fleet. This information coupled with additional information from HMS Falmouth, Southampton and Lion gave Jellicoe the information he needed to decide on his nighttime fleet movements on the night of 31 May-1 June 1916.

Postwar
After the conclusion of World War I, Comus served in the 1st Light Cruiser Squadron from March to April 1919, then underwent a refit at Rosyth, Scotland. She recommissioned in October 1919 for another tour of duty with the 4th Light Cruiser Squadron, and served on the East Indies Station until June 1923, temporarily serving as the stations flagship in 1921. While still assigned to the East Indies Station in November 1922, she began a refit at Portsmouth that lasted until July 1923. She then was attached to the 3rd Light Cruiser Squadron in the Mediterranean Fleet until December 1924, when she entered the Nore Reserve.

Comus left the reserve in September 1925 to commission for service in the 2nd Light Cruiser Squadron in the Atlantic Fleet. After a refit, she recommissioned for the same service in August 1927. The new heavy cruiser  relieved her in May 1930, and she went into reserve at Devonport, becoming the Senior Naval Officers flagship there in April 1931 and remaining flagship until being decommissioned in December 1933 and placed under dockyard control.

Disposal
Comus was sold on 28 July 1934 to Thos. W. Ward of Barrow-in-Furness for scrapping.

References

Bibliography

 Harper, J. E. T. (2016) The Jutland Scandal: The Truth about the First World War's Greatest Sea Battle. New York: Skyhorse Publishing, .

External links 

 Battle of Jutland Crew Lists Project - HMS Comus Crew List

 

C-class cruisers
Ships built on the River Tyne
1914 ships
World War I cruisers of the United Kingdom